Tahoma National Cemetery is a United States National Cemetery in unincorporated King County, Washington. It encompasses , and as of the end of 2019, had over 60,000 interments, compared to the end of 2008 with 23,479 interments, and 15,924 interments in 2005. Administered by the United States Department of Veterans Affairs, it was the only national cemetery in the state of Washington until 2020, when the Vancouver Barracks National Cemetery was established.

History 
Tahoma National Cemetery was established by the Department of Veteran Affairs on November 11, 1993, purchasing  from the Washington State Department of Natural Resources for $1.6 million. It was intended to house 13,000 graves and reach capacity by 2040. Congress approved $10.6 million in funding to build the cemetery in 1994 and design work began the following year. The cemetery was dedicated on September 26, 1997, and opened for interments on October 1.

Until Tahoma was completed, Washington was one of eleven states without a national cemetery; the closest had been the Willamette National Cemetery in Portland, Oregon, where some Washingtonians were buried. A second Washington national cemetery was proposed in 2006 for the Spokane area.

A second phase of construction was completed in 2005.

Noteworthy monuments 
 The Blue Star Memorial, a traditional service flag monument dedicated to all veterans.

Notable interments 
 Medal of Honor recipients
 Second Lieutenant Jesse T. Barrick, for action in the American Civil War.
 Sergeant Dexter J. Kerstetter,  for action in World War II.
 Master Sergeant Wilburn Kirby Ross, for action in World War II.
 Others
 Robert F. Burt, United States Navy chaplain
 Sergeant First Class Nathan Ross Chapman, first American serviceman to die in the line of duty in the United States invasion of Afghanistan in 2002.
 Edward Eugene Claplanhoo, former Chairman of the Makah
 Lieutenant Colonel Edward J. Saylor, Ret. U.S. Air Force veteran of World War II who participated in the Doolittle Raid on Japan on April 18, 1942.
 Frosty Westering, Hall of Fame college football coach
 Frank Williams (gridiron football)

References

External links 

 National Cemetery Administration
 Tahoma National Cemetery
 
 

Cemeteries in Washington (state)
Protected areas of King County, Washington
United States national cemeteries
Geography of Kent, Washington